Bruchidius anderssoni, is a species of leaf beetle found in India, Nepal, Sri Lanka, Thailand and Vietnam.

Description
It is a smaller species with maximum body length of 1.2 to 1.3 mm. Antennae dark brown with blackish apical segment. Posterior tarsi are black, whereas posterior legs are reddish brown. There is a small blunt tubercle on elongated elytra. Elytral integument is black.

It is a seed borer commonly found in Desmodium gangeticum seeds.

References 

Bruchinae
Insects of Sri Lanka
Beetles described in 1975